40S ribosomal protein S8 is a protein that in humans is encoded by the RPS8 gene.

Ribosomes, the organelles that catalyze protein synthesis, consist of a small 40S subunit and a large 60S subunit. Together these subunits are composed of 4 RNA species and approximately 80 structurally distinct proteins. This gene encodes a ribosomal protein that is a component of the 40S subunit. The protein belongs to the S8E family of ribosomal proteins. It is located in the cytoplasm. Increased expression of this gene in colorectal tumors and colon polyps compared to matched normal colonic mucosa has been observed. This gene is co-transcribed with the small nucleolar RNA genes U38A, U38B, U39, and U40, which are located in its fourth, fifth, first, and second introns, respectively. As is typical for genes encoding ribosomal proteins, there are multiple processed pseudogenes of this gene dispersed through the genome.

References

Further reading

Ribosomal proteins